Campton Township is located in Kane County, Illinois. As of the 2010 census, its population was 17,174 and it contained 5,662 housing units.

The township's rural character is subject to increased development.  Following an annexation by Elgin, Illinois of northern land for high density development, in May 2007 most of the unincorporated areas of the township became part of the new Village of Campton Hills.

Geography

Demographics

Trivia
 In the 1840s, the family of young Charles Ingalls moved from New York to the tallgrass prairie of Campton Township, just west of Elgin, Illinois.

References

External links
Official Homepage

Townships in Kane County, Illinois
Townships in Illinois